The 1866 Birthday Honours were appointments by Queen Victoria to various orders and honours to reward and highlight good works by citizens of the British Empire. The appointments were made to celebrate the official birthday of the Queen, and were published in The London Gazette on 25 May and 29 May 1866.

The recipients of honours are displayed here as they were styled before their new honour, and arranged by honour, with classes (Knight, Knight Grand Cross, etc.) and then divisions (Military, Civil, etc.) as appropriate.

United Kingdom and British Empire

Duke and Earl
His Royal Highness Prince Alfred Ernest Albert , as Earl of Ulster, Earl of Kent, and Duke of Edinburgh

Earl
The Right Honourable John, Baron Wodehouse, by the name, style, and title of Earl of Kimberley, of Kimberley, in the county of Norfolk

The Most Exalted Order of the Star of India

Knight Commander (KCSI)

The Rajah Shreemun Maharajah Chuttroputtee Shahabe Dam Altafhoo, of Kolhapoor
Cecil Beadon, Bengal Civil Service, Lieutenant-Governor of Bengal
The Nawab Salar Jung Bahadoor, of Hyderabad, in the Deccan
Donald Friell McLeod  Bengal Civil Service, Lieutenant-Governor of the Punjab
The Maharajah Jeypercash Singh Bahadoor, of Deo, in Behar
Henry Ricketts, Bengal Civil Service (Retired), late Member of the Council of the Governor-General of India
The Maharajah Mirza Gajapati Raz Maune Sultan
Bahadoor, Zemindar of Vizianagram, Member of Council of the Governor-General of India for making Laws and Regulations
Henry Byng Harington, Bengal Civil Service (Retired), late Member of the Council of the Governor-General of India
The Maharajah Dig Bijye Singh, of Bulrampoor
Walter Elliot, Madras Civil Service (Retired), late Member of the Council of the Governor of Madras
Sharf-ul-Omrah Bahadoor, Member of the Council of the Governor-General of India for making Laws and Regulations
Thomas Pycroft, Madras Civil Service, Member of the Council of the Governor of Madras
The Rajah Jymungul Singh, of Gidhore, in Monghyr
John Macpherson Macleod, Madras Civil Service (Retired), Member of the Indian Law Commission
The Rajah Dinkur Rao, late Member of the Council of the Governor-General of India for making Laws and Regulations
Major-General Isaac Campbell Coffin, Madras Army, late Commanding the Hyderabad Subsidiary Force
The Rajah Radhakanth Deb
Major-General George St Patrick Lawrence  Bengal Staff Corps, late Agent to the Governor-General of India at Rajpootana
The Rajah of Drangadra
Major-General George Moyle Sherer, late Bengal Army, sometime commanding the 73rd Regiment of Bengal Native Infantry
The Rajah Deo Narain Singh, of Benares
Major-General Sir Arthur Thomas Cotton   Royal (late Madras) Engineers
Meer Shere Mahomed, of Meerpoor
Major-General Sir Neville Bowles Chamberlain  Bengal Army, late commanding the Punjab Irregular Force
The Rajah Sahib Dyal Missar, Member of the Council of the Governor-General of India for making Laws and Regulations
George Udny Yule  Bengal Civil Service, resident at Hyderabad
Tanjore Madava Rao Dewan, of Travancore
Charles John Wingfield  Bengal Civil Service, late Chief Commissioner of Oude
The Thakoor Rawul Jeswunt Singjee, of Bhownuggur
Colonel  Sir Herbert Benjamin Edwardes  Bengal Army, Commissioner and Agent to the Governor-General of India in the Cis-Sutlej States, Hakeem Saadut Ali Khan
Colonel Arnold Burrowes Kemball  Royal (late Bombay) Artillery, Political Agent in Turkish Arabia
Sirdar Nihal Singh Chachi
Lieutenant-Colonel Thomas Wilkinson, late Bengal Army, sometime resident at Nagpoor
Lieutenant-Colonel Robert Wallace, Bombay Staff Corps, late resident at Baroda
Lieutenant-Colonel William Henry Rodes Green  Bombay Staff Corps, Political Superintendent in Upper Scinde
Major George Wingate, late Bombay Engineers, sometime Member of the Survey Commission at Bombay

Companion (CSI)

The Nawab Syed Asghur Ali Khan
Fleetwood Williams, Bengal Civil Service, Commissioner of Revenue and Circuit for the Meerut Division
The Nawab Foujdar Khan
Charles Raikes, Bengal Civil Service (retired), late Judge of the Sudder Dewannee and Nizamut Adawlut, North West Provinces
The Rajah Bindessery Pershad, of Sirgooja and Oodeypoor
Samuel Mansfield, Bombay Civil Service, Commissioner in Scinde
The Rajah Pertab Chund Singh
Arthur Austin Roberts  Benga Civil Service, Judicial Commissioner in the Punjab
The Rajah Sutto Chund Ghosal
Cudbert Bensley Thornhill, Bengal Civi Service, Commissioner of Revenue and Circuit at Allahabad
The Rajah Yelugoti Kumara Yachamu Nayuda Bahadoor, Zemindar of Veukatagiri
William Ford, Bengal Civil Service Commissioner at Mooltan
The Rajah Bhowanee Singh, of Mynpoorie
William Rose Robinson, Madras Civi Service, Inspector-General of Police, Madras Presidency
Colonel Crawford Trotter Chamberlain, Bengal Staff Corps, Commandant of the 1st Benga Cavalry
The Rajah Sheoraj Singh, of Kasheepoor
Colonel Richard Strachey, Royal (late Bengal) Engineers, late Secretary in the Public Works Department, Government of India
The Rajah Teekum Singh, of Morsan
Colonel Reynell George Taylor  Bengal Staff Corps, Commissioner in the Punjab
The Rajah Jeswunt Rao, of Etawah
Colonel Alfred Thomas Wilde  Madras Staff Corps, Commanding the Punjab Irregular Force
Dhe Rajah of Bansee, Goruckpoor
Colonel William Frederick Marriott, Bombay Staff Corps, Military Secretary to Government at Bombay
The Rajah Hurdeo Bux Bahadoor, of Kutyaree
Richard Temple, Bengal Civil Service, Chief Commissioner in the Central Provinces
The Rajah Dig Bijye Singh, of Morarmow
John Walter Sherer, Bengal Civil Service, Magistrate and Collector in Bundlecund
The Dewan Cheeboo Lama
James Davidson Gordon, Bengal Civil Service, Magistrate and Collector at Pubna
The Dewan Moolla Buksh, of Patna
Lieutenant-Colonel Edward John Lake, Royal (late Bengal) Engineers, Financial Commissioner in the Punjab
Sirdar Soorut Singh, of Benares
Lieutenant-Colonel John Colpoys Haughton, Bengal Staff Corps, Commissioner at Cooch-Behar
Syud Azimooddeen Hussun Khan Bahadoor
William Mackenzie  Deputy Inspector-General of Hospitals, Madras Establishment
Syud Hussun al Edroos, of Surat
Lieutenant-Colonel Richard John Meade, Bengal Army, Agent for the Governor-General of India in Central India
Ruggonath Row Wittul, Chief of Vinchoor
Major Richard Harte Keatinge  Bombay Staff Corps, Political Agent at Kattywar
Ghulam Ali Khan, Jaghirdar of Bunganapalle
Major William McNeile, Bengal Staff Corps, Deputy Commissioner in the Punjab
Baboo Prosunno Comar Tagne
Major John William Younghusband, Bombay Staff Corps, Inspector-General of Police in the Hyderabad Districts
Baboo Amendanath Roy, of Nattore
Eyre Burton Powell, Director of Public Instruction at Madras
Madanna Juggah Rao, of Rajahmundry
Sheth Maomull, of Kurrachee
John Fleming, of Bombay
Gajalu Lakshminarasu Seth
Abdoollah David Sassoon, of Bombay

References

Birthday Honours
1866 awards
1866 in India
1866 in the United Kingdom